The 2008 Red Bull Air Race World Series season was the sixth Red Bull Air Race World Series season. The 2008 champion was Hannes Arch, who won the series for the first time.

Aircraft and pilots

New pilots 
South African Glen Dell was the only new pilot to join the Red Bull Air Race Series for the 2008 season as Klaus Schrodt and Frank Versteegh left the series.

Race calendar and results 

* Due to strong winds, the first day of racing in Detroit was cancelled.

* Due to course complications, the race in Stockholm was cancelled.

* Due to security reasons, the race in Spain was cancelled.

Championship standings

References

External links 
 Red Bull Air Race official website
 Unofficial Air Race website
 Smoke-On.com A Red Bull Air Race Fan Site
 Bleacher Report's Red Bull Air Race Page

Red Bull Air Race World Championship seasons
Red Bull Air Race
Red Bull Air Race World Series